The Japanese submarine I-28 was one of 20 Type B cruiser submarines of the B1 sub-class built for the Imperial Japanese Navy (IJN) during the 1940s.

Design and description
They displaced  surfaced and  submerged.

For surface running, the boats were powered by two  diesel engines, each driving one propeller shaft. When submerged each propeller was driven by a  electric motor. They could reach  on the surface and  underwater.

The boats were armed with six internal bow  torpedo tubes and carried a total of 17 torpedoes. They were also armed with a single /40 deck gun and two single mounts for  Type 96 anti-aircraft guns. In the Type Bs, the aircraft hangar was faired into the base of the conning tower. A single catapult was positioned on the forward deck.

Construction and career
I-28 was commissioned at Kobe, Japan on February 6, 1942. The submarine participated in the Battle of the Coral Sea in May 1942.

Notes

References
 

Type B1 submarines
Ships built by Mitsubishi Heavy Industries
1940 ships
World War II submarines of Japan
Japanese submarines lost during World War II
World War II shipwrecks in the Pacific Ocean
Ships sunk by American submarines
Ships lost with all hands
Maritime incidents in May 1942
Submarines sunk by submarines